105 Mile Lake is a small lake near the town of 105 Mile House. Both are named for their distance from Lillooet via the Old Cariboo Road.

Sources
http://www.topozone.com/map.asp?lon=-121.3&lat=51.6667&datum=nad83

Lakes of the Cariboo
Lillooet Land District